Beaton may refer to:

Places
Beaton, British Columbia, locality in Canada 
Beaton Creek, tributary of Columbia River, Canada

People

Surname
Beaton (surname), a surname with multiple origins, list of people with the name
Beaton medical kindred, a Scottish family
Cecil Beaton, English photographer
David Beaton Archbishop of St Andrews
Janet Beaton Lady of Branxholme and Buccleugh
John Beaton Football referee 
Kate Beaton Webcomic artist
Steve Beaton Darts player

Given name
 Beaton Tulk (born 1944), Canadian politician
 Beaton Squires (1881–?), Canadian football player and lawyer

See also
Mrs Beeton
Beeton (disambiguation)